The May Bumps 2009 were a set of rowing races held in Cambridge, UK from Wednesday 10 June 2009 to Saturday 13 June 2009. The bumps featured crews from all Cambridge University Colleges and Anglia Ruskin University. The races were run as a bumps race and were the 118th set of races in the series of May Bumps which have been held annually in mid-June in this form since 1887. In 2009, a total of 171 crews are expected to take part (94 men's crews and 77 women's crews), with over 1500 participants in total.

Two clubs changed their names in 2009.  became  reflecting the college name change.  became  reflecting the change in the University's name a couple of years previously.

Head of the River crews 

Caius managed to close to within a third of a length for much of the course on the Friday.

  W1 also rowed over to retain their headship gained in 2008.

This was the first time since 1994 that there was no change in either the men's or women's headship.

Highest 2nd VIIIs 

  remained the highest men's 2nd VIII at the end of the week, despite being bumped into 15th position.

  remained the highest women's 2nd VIII at the end of the week at 17th position, having started 15th.

Pegasus Cup and the Biggest Risers 

Hughes Hall won the Pegasus cup again, claiming it back after a one-year loan to St Edmunds. Three of the club's boats got blades and their second men's boat had a meteoric rise of eleven places up the rankings.

 In the women's competition,  climbed eleven places, finishing above

Links to races in other years

Bumps Charts 

Below are the bumps charts all 6 men's and all 5 women's divisions, with the men's event on the left and women's event on the right. The bumps chart represents the progress of every crew over all four days of the racing. To follow the progress of any particular crew, simply find the crew's name on the left side of the chart and follow the line to the end-of-the-week finishing position on the right of the chart.

Note that this chart may not be displayed correctly if you are using a large font size on your browser. A simple way to check is to see that the first horizontal bold line, marking the boundary between divisions, lies between positions 17 and 18. The combined Hughes Hall/ Lucy Cavendish women's crews are listed as Lucy Cavendish only.

The Getting-on Race 

The Getting-on Race allows a number of crews which did not already have a place from last year's races to compete for the right to race this year. Up to ten crews are removed from the bottom of last year's finishing order, who must then race alongside new entrants to decide which crews gain a place (with one bumps place per 3 crews competing, subject to the maximum of 10 available places).

The 2009 May Bumps Getting-on Race took place on 5 June 2009.

Competing crews

Men 

12 men's crews raced for 4 available spaces at the bottom of the 6th division. The following were successful and will row in the bumps.

 
 
 
 

The following were unsuccessful.

 
 
 
 
 
 
 

The following did not race.

Women 

7 women's crews raced for 6 available spaces at the bottom of the 5th division. The following were successful and will row in the bumps.

 
 
 
 
 /*
 

The following did not race.

References

External links 
 CUCBC - the organisation that runs the bumps
 1st & 3rd Trinity Boat Club - instant results service
 Cambridge University Radio (CUR1350) - live commentary, instant results, downloadable MP3s of race commentary

May Bumps results
May Bumps
May Bumps
May Bumps